Gerhard Haerendel is a German space scientist.

Life and career
Born in 1935, Haerendel obtained his PhD in physics from the University of Munich in 1963.

He was elected to the Max Planck Institute for Physics and Astrophysics as a Fellow in 1969.

He became the director of the Max Planck Institute for Physics and Astrophysics in 1972, and he retired in 2000.

Awards
 Fellow of the American Geophysical Union
 Jean Dominique Cassini Medal of the European Geosciences Union
 Space Science Award of the Committee on Space Research
 Van Allen Medal
 Von Karman Award by the International Academy of Astronautics

References

1935 births
German academics
Ludwig Maximilian University of Munich alumni
Living people
Members of the Royal Swedish Academy of Sciences
Max Planck Institute directors